Electrodeposition may refer to:

Electroplating, a process that uses electric current to reduce dissolved metal cations so that they form a coherent metal coating on an electrode.
Electrophoretic deposition, a term for a broad range of industrial processes which includes electrocoating, e-coating, cathodic electrodeposition, anodic electrodeposition and electrophoretic coating, or electrophoretic painting
Underpotential deposition, a phenomenon of electrodeposition of a species (typically reduction of a metal cation to a solid metal) at a potential less negative than the equilibrium (Nernst) potential for the reduction of this metal